I Will Be Nothing Without Your Love is the fifth studio album by American electropop singer-songwriter The Ready Set. It was released on April 8, 2016 by Hopeless Records.

Background
Witzigreuter signed with Hopeless Records prior to the release of I Will Be Nothing Without Your Love. He spoke about signing with the label in an interview with Alternative Press.

Witzigreuter believes that the album gets to be a little more honest and feels more like him.

Singles
Two singles were released from the album. "Good Enough" was released as the first single on February 5, 2016 along with its music video directed by Erik Rojas. A remix by Michael Brun was released on May 20, 2016, which led the song to have a bigger impact, reaching more than 8 million streams on Spotify and peaked at number 40 on the US Dance/Mix Show Airplay chart. "Disappearing Act" was released as the second single on March 11, 2016 along the premiere of its music video, directed by Megan Thompson. "Swim" was released as a promotional single on March 31, 2016 before the album's arrival.

Critical reception

Tim Sendra of AllMusic describes Witzigreuter's work as "carefully crafted arrangements like they were meant to be together forever, his lyrics touch on pain, but in a harmless, easy to swallow fashion, and the sleek production goes down smooth but never sounds plastic." He also compliments his album as he states, "I Will Be Nothing Without Your Love is The Ready Set's most impressively Pop record yet." Amy Ebeling of Alternative Press says, "although songs begin to blend into one another and certain hooks become repetitive over the span of the LP, I Will Be Nothing Without Your Love is well worth a listen."

Track listing
All songs written and produced by Jordan Witzigreuter except where noted.

Personnel
Credits for I Will Be Nothing Without Your Love adapted from AllMusic.

 Jordan Witzigreuter - engineer, producer
 James Bairian - composer
 Rick Carson - mastering, mixing
 Louis Castle - composer
 Brian Manley - artwork, layout
 Ansley Newman - featured artist
 Deryck Russel - mastering, mixing
 Evan Tetreault - photography
 Megan Thompson - photography
 Mackenzie Thoms - composer
 Cameron Walker - composer, guitar

Charts

References

2016 albums
The Ready Set albums
Hopeless Records albums